Eupithecia acutangula is a moth of the family Geometridae first described by George Hampson in 1895. It is found in Pakistan and India.

There are at least two generations per year.

References

Moths described in 1895
acutangula
Moths of Asia